Bauxite mining on Rennell Island began on the west side of the island in about 2011. Rennell Island is part of the Solomon Islands in the Pacific Ocean. Bintang Delapan Group is one of the major operators of the mine, subcontracted by Asia Pacific Investment Development.

The mine has had multiple spills, causing environmental damage, and local residents say they have not benefited from the mine in proportion to the damage it has caused. The government acknowledged that the mine was poorly regulated. The mining lease was cancelled in October 2020, although the mining company has contested this cancellation in court.

Background 
Bauxite is one of the main ingredients used to manufacture aluminium.

Location 
Rennell Island, a UNESCO World Heritage Site, and neighbouring Bellona Island have a combined population of around 3,000 people.

A 2011 to 2021 uptick in bauxite mining in the area occurred around the same time as logging activities.

History 
The mining company paid the government of the Solomon Islands US$17.8m in 2020 and US$16.4m in 2019.

Authorities estimate that about 50% of the bauxite deposit was exported between 2014 and 2021. In 2021, the Solomon Islands government reported that Bintang Delapan had failed to pay taxes and royalties on one third of the bauxite shipments they had exported since 2015, leaving the company owing around AU $16 million of unpaid taxes.

Impact 
Although the local economy flourished during the peak of the mining boom, the government concedes that the mining leases were poorly regulated, and the Solomon Islands have not benefited from the mining activity. Residents have said that the fabric of their community was damaged by the influx of foreign workers and that their water and soils are polluted.

In February 2019, during Cyclone Oma, a bulk carrier was grounded on Kongobainiu reef and spilled 300 tonnes of oil into the bay. Local people were unable to fish, their livestock died, and children suffered from skin and eye infections. Losses were estimated at $50 million. Estimates suggest that over 10,000 square metres of reef and over 4,000 square metres of lagoon habitat were destroyed and could take 130 years to recover.

5,000 tonnes of bauxite were spilled into the bay in July 2019. By 2021, over half of the impacted areas had not been rehabilitated.

References

Further reading 

 Biogenesis of the Renell Bauxite
 World Heritage Site in Danger
 Rennell and Island of Two Halves
Environmental justice
2010s establishments in the Solomon Islands
Bauxite mines in the Solomon Islands